Mike McGruder (born May 6, 1964) is a former American football player who played in the National Football League. He played in Super Bowl XXXI with the New England Patriots as a cornerback. He played a total of 12 years of professional football in the NFL and CFL (Saskatchewan Roughriders). This Cleveland Heights, Ohio High School track and football stand out began his professional career after being a four-year starter at Kent State University. McGruder was team football captain his senior year and 2 year captain of the track team at Kent State University.

McGruder was among league leaders being tied for third in the NFC with 5 interceptions in 1993 while playing with the San Francisco 49ers. McGruder was a finalist for the NFL Bart Starr Award in 1997. Mike McGruder was voted one of the best names in the NFL.

McGruder has two daughters, Jenerra and Dior.

References

1964 births
Living people
American football cornerbacks
Green Bay Packers players
Miami Dolphins players
San Francisco 49ers players
Tampa Bay Buccaneers players
New England Patriots players
Kent State Golden Flashes football players
Players of American football from Cleveland
Cleveland Heights High School alumni